Patiparn Pataweekarn (also Mos Patiparn or Mos, born March 23, 1973), is a Thai film and television actor and pop singer from GMM Grammy.

Biography
Mos debuted at 16 as a model for a magazine by Poj Anon in 1990, but has become mainly known as an actor and a singer. He has a twin brother name "Aon Dettarn Pataweekarn".  He became the rising star when he played as "Peerapol" in the high-rating 3 Num 3 Mum sitcom (EXACT, GMM Grammy) together with Songsit Roongnophakunsri (Kob) and Saksit Tangtong (Tang) in 1991. A year later, he released his debut album, "Ur Hur". Mos' second album, "Mr. Mos" became his most successful album ever with the sale amount of 1.5 million copies. So far, he's released 8 albums (with another 10 special albums). He starred in Exact's musical for the first time in "Bangkok 2485". Afterthat, Mos did several dramas including the acclaimed "Hua Jai Chocolate", "Duay Rang Hang Ruk", "Ubattihet Hua Jai", etc. Latest he's been honourly given the leading role in "Fah Jarod Sai-The Musical". Now Mos plays the police officer in Exact-Scenario's new sitcom called "Poo Kong Jao Sa-nae", and he's also hosting the 3 Num 3 Mum Variety Show with Kob and Tang.

Filmography

Movies

Television

Musicals
2004    Bangkok 2485 The Musical (บางกอก 2485 เดอะมิวสิคัล)
2007    Fah Jarod Sai The Musical (ฟ้าจรดทราย เดอะมิวสิคัล)
2009    Lom Hai Jai The Musical (ลมหายใจ เดอะมิวสิคัล)

Discography 

Albums
1992　　Mos Ur Hur
1994　　Mr. Mos – Mai Ruk Mai Dai Laew
1995　　Moving Mos
1997　　Mos Maew Moo
1998　　Patiparn Party
2001　　Mr. Mos Happy Trip ... Salad Sabut
2002　　Mos Special 11 * Celebration of 11th year career
2005　　Mos Patiparn
2008　　9 Mos (Nine Mos)

Special Albums 
1995　　Tee Wang Kaung Tur * various artists collaboration
1995　　6-2-12 * various artists collaboration
1997　　MOS＆TATA * collaboration with Tata Young
2001　　CHEER * various artists collaboration
2001　　MOSKAT * collaboration with Katreeya English
2003　　A:LIVE　PROJECT01/PROJECT 02
2003　　Ruk Harm Promote Drama Original Soundtrack * co-release with Pim of Zaza
2004　　Bangkok 2485 The Musical (Vol. 1 Cast Recording & Vol. 2 Original Songs)
2004　　Ruk Kern Pikad Kaen Drama Original Soundtrack
2006　　Narongvit Sleepless Society vol. 2 *various artists
2007　　Fah Jarod Sai The Musical Original Cast Recording
2007　　MOS-ICE-PECK "15 Films" *MV compilation DVD, released in Japan
2007　　Hua Jai Sila Drama Original Soundtrack * various artists including Mos' "Poo Gaung Jow Sa Nay" OST.
2008　　Pleng Hot Lakorn Hit Vol. 2 * various artists including Mos' "Sang Dao Hang Hua Jai" and "Ruk Dai Tae Ruk".

Singles 
1997　　Ting Gun Dai Ngai/Piang Puen – MOS＆TATA * collaboration with Tata Young
1997　　Happy Birthday – MOS, TATA & NAT * collaboration with Tata Young & Nat Myria Benedetti

Compilation Albums
1996　　Double Hits – MOS & AOM  (Tied with Aom Sunisa's hits)
1997　　HAPPY MOS  (Black-covered Hit Compilation)
1999　　Mos Patiparn Pataweekarn Karaoke Compilation
2000　　THE VERY BEST OF MOS * during studying abroad in LA　
2003　　VERY MOS
2006　　Be My Mos

Concert VCDs
1994　　Mos Peeraga Wara Valentine
1994　　Mr. Mos Sensurround Concert
1994　　Mr. Mos Eek Suk Tee Gub U.H.T Kaw Dee Na Puen Concert
1995　　Moving Mos – Move Neu Make Concert
1995　　Mos in the Drawing Room – Guess Who's Moving
1995　　6-2-12 Concert
1997　　Mos-Tata & Friends Concert 
2001　　CHEER Greet Toom Boom Concert
2002　　10th Anniversary Mos Concert – Mai Ruk ... Kaw Bah Laew
2002　　Mahagum Concert (Vol.1 Pop Grammy)
2002　　EXACT 10th Anniversary Concert
2002　　J Jetrin – Bangkok Show The Return of J Jetrin (Mos as guest)
2003　　Pattaya Music Festival 2003 (Vol. 1 Pop Rock)
2003　　Thailand IP Festival 2003 Highlight (Vol. 1)
2007　　Sleepless Society vol. 2 Concert
2008　　3 Num 3 Mic Concert 2008
April 2009 U.S.A Tour "Mos Wanted Live Concert"

Variety Shows 
2007.04 3 Num 3 Mum Variety, TV9
2008.01 3 Num 3 Mum Tonight, TV5

Commercials
 [1990] SUGUS Candy (Pre-debut)
 [1990] FARM HOUSE Bread (Pre-debut)
 [1992] COCA Instant Noodle
 [1993] Coca-Cola (Coke)
 [1995] DUTCH MILL Milk
 [1997] YAMAHA Motorcycle : Tiara Model
 [1998] LAYS Potato chips
 [2001] LOTTE NO TIME Gum
 [2002] DTAC Mobile Phone Network
 [2002] M150 Energy Drink
 [2008] ISUZU DMAX Hi-Lander Gold Series

References

External links
Mos Patiparn Official Japan Site
Mistermosclub.com
Patiparn.com
Mos-Fanclub.com
MOS Thread @ Popcornfor2.com
Mos Patiparn Fanclub @ EXACT-SCENARIO

1973 births
Living people
Patiparn Patavekarn
Patiparn Patavekarn
Musicians Institute alumni
Patiparn Patavekarn
Patiparn Patavekarn
Patiparn Patavekarn
Patiparn Patavekarn
Patiparn Patavekarn